Mohamed Ismail Gafoor (born 1963) is a Singaporean Indian business executive. Ismail rose from delivering newspapers as a boy to become the CEO of Singapore's largest real estate company, PropNex.

Career

Personal life

References

1963 births
Living people
Singaporean business executives